Spirorbula is a genus of air-breathing land snails, terrestrial pulmonate gastropod mollusks in the subfamily Geomitrinae of the family Geomitridae, the hairy snails and their allies.

Distribution
The distribution of the genus Spirorbula includes the area from Madeira to Porto Santo in the country of Portugal.

Species
Species within the genus Spirobula include:
 Spirorbula depauperata (R. T. Lowe, 1831)
 Spirorbula latens (R. T. Lowe, 1852)
 † Spirorbula latina (Paiva, 1866) 
 Spirorbula obtecta (R. T. Lowe, 1852) - type species
 Spirorbula squalida (R.T. Lowe, 1852)

References

 
Geomitridae
Taxonomy articles created by Polbot